In mechanics, a few-body system consists of a small number of well-defined structures or point particles.

Quantum mechanics
In quantum mechanics, examples of few-body systems include light nuclear systems (that is, few-nucleon bound and scattering states), small molecules,  light atoms (such as helium in an external electric field), atomic collisions, and quantum dots. A fundamental difficulty in describing few-body systems is that the Schrödinger equation and the classical equations of motion are not analytically solvable for more than two mutually interacting particles even when the underlying forces are precisely known.  This is known as the few-body problem.  For some three-body systems an exact solution can be obtained iteratively through the Faddeev equations. It can be shown that under certain conditions Faddeev equations should lead to the Efimov effect.  Some special cases of three-body systems are amenable to analytical solutions (or nearly so) - by special treatments - such as the Hydrogen molecular ion whose eigenenergies can be given in terms of a generalized Lambert W function or the Helium atom which has been solved very precisely using basis sets of Hylleraas or Frankowski-Pekeris functions (see references of the work of G.W.F. Drake and J.D. Morgan III in Helium atom section).

In many cases theory has to resort to approximations to treat few-body systems.  These approximations have to be tested by detailed experimental data.  Atomic collisions are particularly suitable for such tests.  The fundamental force underlying atomic systems, the electromagnetic force, is essentially understood.  Therefore, any discrepancy found between experiment and theory can be directly related to the description of few-body effects.  In nuclear systems, in contrast, the underlying force is much less understood.  Furthermore, in atomic collisions the number of particles can be kept small enough so that complete kinematic information about every single particle in the system can be obtained experimentally (see article on kinematically complete experiment).  In systems with large particle numbers, in contrast, usually only statistically averaged or collective quantities about the system can be measured.

Classical mechanics
In classical mechanics, the few-body problem is a subset of the N-body problem.

Research
One notable journal covering this field is Few-body Systems.

Few Body Topical Group at American Physical Society.

References

 L.D. Faddeev, S.P. Merkuriev, Quantum Scattering Theory for Several Particle Systems, Springer, August 31, 1993, .
 M. Schulz et al., Three-Dimensional Imaging of Atomic Four-Body Processes, Nature 422, 48 (2003)
 Erich Schmid, Horst Ziegelmann, The quantum mechanical three-body problem, University of California, 1974
 В.Б. Беляев (V.B. Belyaev), "Лекции по теории малочастичных систем" (Lectures on the theory of few-body systems), М., Энергоатом из дат (Energoatomizdat, Moscow), 1986

External links
 Bogolyubov Theoretical Physics Laboratory (Joint Institute of Nuclear Research), Sector Few-Body Systems
 Joint Institute of Nuclear Research (Russia)
 American Physical Society Few Body Topical Group 

Classical mechanics
Quantum mechanics